The 2011 edition of the Women's Handball Tournament of the African Games was the 8th, organized by the African Handball Confederation and played under the auspices of the International Handball Federation, the handball sport governing body. The tournament ran from September 8–17, 2011 in Maputo, Mozambique, contested by 12 national teams and won by Egypt.

Participating teams

Preliminary round
The draw was held on May 6, 2011.

Group A

Group B

Group C

Group D

Knockout stage

Championship bracket

Quarterfinals

Semifinals

Third place game

Final

5–8th place bracket

Semifinals

Seventh place game

Fifth place game

9–12th place bracket

Semifinals

Eleventh place game

Ninth place game

Final standings

See also
Handball at the 2011 All-Africa Games – Women's tournament

References

Match schedule 

Handball at the 2011 All-Africa Games
Handball in Mozambique